Guram Zakharovich Adzhoyev (born 18 October 1961) is a retired Soviet professional footballer of Kurdish ethnicity. Adzhoyev is Yazidi. He is the president of FC Arsenal Tula.

Playing career
He made his professional debut in the Soviet First League in 1980 for FC Torpedo Kutaisi.

His son, also called Guram Adzhoyev, is now a professional footballer as well.

Honours
 Soviet Top League runner-up: 1984, 1985.
 Soviet Cup winner: 1988.
 Ukrainian Cup finalist: 1992.

European club competitions
 UEFA Cup 1982–83 with FC Dynamo Moscow: 1 game.
 UEFA Cup 1984–85 with FC Spartak Moscow: 4 games.
 UEFA Cup 1985–86 with FC Spartak Moscow: 1 game.
 UEFA Cup 1987–88 with FC Dinamo Tbilisi: 2 games.
 European Cup Winners' Cup 1988–89 with FC Metalist Kharkiv: 4 games, 1 goal.

References

External links
 
 

1961 births
Yazidis from Georgia (country)
Living people
Soviet footballers
Footballers from Georgia (country)
Expatriate footballers from Georgia (country)
Soviet expatriate footballers
Soviet Top League players
Soviet First League players
FC Dinamo Tbilisi players
FC Dynamo Moscow players
FC Spartak Moscow players
FC Metalist Kharkiv players
FC Slavkhlib Slovyansk players
Beitar Jerusalem F.C. players
Diósgyőri VTK players
FC Saturn Ramenskoye players
Ukrainian Premier League players
Ukrainian Amateur Football Championship players
Expatriate footballers in Israel
Expatriate footballers in Ukraine
Expatriate footballers in Hungary
Footballers from Tbilisi
Soviet expatriate sportspeople in Israel
Russian people of Kurdish descent

Association football midfielders
Kurdish sportspeople